The Protector is a 1997 American action film written by Jack Gill, Dee McLachlan, Stuart Beattie, and Andrea Buck, and directed by Gill. It stars Matt McColm as Kenneth James Conway, an ex-commando and a private detective investigating the disappearance of a virologist. Supporting cast includes Ron Perlman, John Rhys-Davies, and Carol Alt.

Cast 
 Matt McColm as Kenneth James Conway
 Ron Perlman as Dr. Ramsey Krago
 Carol Alt as Agent Monica McBride
 Annabel Schofield as Marisa
 John Rhys-Davies as Rasheed
 Morgan Brittany as Sloane Matthews
 Clint Howard as Hutch
 Michael Paul Chan as Dr. Anthony Mane
 Rodger LaRue as Agent Leo Dumass
 Jack Gill as Dr. Stanley Erhardt
 Terrence Stone as Myles Vale
 Henry Kingi as Van Driver
 Patrick St. Esprit as Security Guard
 Kane Hodder as Guard

Production 
In 1996, stuntman and actor Matt McColm has been labelled by Los Angeles Times as "Hollywood's next-generation action star," following in the footsteps of Arnold Schwarzenegger and Sylvester Stallone. His previous entries in the action genre included Red Scorpion 2 (1994) and Subterfuge (1996). The Protector gave McColm a chance to impress the audiences with both his perfect musculature and martial-arts skills—since he has a black belt in Kenpo Karate. Prior to the filming director Jack Gill worked primarily as a stuntman, stunt coordinator, and second unit director.

Release 
A-Pix Entertainment released the movie in the United States on VHS in 1997. The following year the film was released in Canada by Coscient Astral Distribution, under the title Conway.

Reception 
Douglas R. Pratt reviewed The Protector in his 2004 guide Doug Pratt's DVD: Movies, Television, Music, Art, Adult, and More!, Volume 1, noting, "the story is an adequate backdrop for the gunfights, car crashes, and other activities this sort of movie can be depended upon to deliver." In a journal for Dammaged Goods—a cinema-related website—The Protector was called a "quasi exploitative action film" that "makes good use of its resources, has some fun in the process and doesn't try to be something it's not." Furthermore, the central performance is praised: "Stunt performer turned leading man Matt McColm plays Conway with rogue charm while flexing his muscles and martial-arts prowess. Ruggedly handsome, McColm doesn't take things too seriously and is a likeable enough hero." Yippee-ki-yay! editor Albert Nowicki complimented McColm in his leading role, calling his character a "convincing cinematic tough guy", with a "stunning musculature" and good magnetism. He went on to berate other cast members, though, and called Carol Alt an "expressionless beauty".

Cinema.de provided a negative note, giving it one star out of five. Movies Room described the movie, along with Subterfuge, as "tacky and second-class" but also "enjoyable".

References

Bibliography 
 Pratt, Douglas R. (2004). Doug Pratt's DVD: Movies, Television, Music, Art, Adult, and More!, Volume 1. 178–179. Harbor Electronic Publishing. .

External links 
 
 

1997 action films
1997 films
American action films
Films about infectious diseases
Films about scientists
1990s English-language films
1990s American films